The George Palmer and Dorothy Binney Putnam House is a historic house located in Bend, Oregon.

Description and history 
The house is a -story, single-family residence in the American Craftsman style. The home was purchased by newspaper publisher George P. Putnam and his new bride, Dorothy Binney Putnam, the heiress to the Crayola fortune, following their honeymoon in 1912. They named the estate "Pinelyn." At the time it was the third most expense home constructed in Bend, Oregon in 1911–1912, at a cost of $4,000. The Putnam's lived in the house until 1914, and sold it in 1919. The Putnams were divorced in 1929 and Mr. Putnam married famed aviator Amelia Earhart.

Retaining its original character and charm, a majority of the historic fabric in the house is intact. It was listed on the National Register of Historic Places on May 29, 1998.

See also
 National Register of Historic Places listings in Deschutes County, Oregon

References

1911 establishments in Oregon
American Craftsman architecture in Oregon
Bungalow architecture in Oregon
Houses completed in 1911
Houses on the National Register of Historic Places in Bend, Oregon